League table for teams participating in Ykkönen, the second tier of the Finnish Soccer League system, in 1989.

League table

Replay for 2nd place: Kumu Kuusankoski - Koparit Kuopio  4-2

Premier Division/Division One 1989, promotion/relegation playoff

Kumu Kuusankoski - KePS Kemi  2-0
KePS Kemi - Kumu Kuusankoski  1-0

Kumu Kuusankoski promoted, KePS Kemi relegated.

See also
Mestaruussarja (Tier 1)

References

Ykkönen seasons
2
Fin
Fin